D.S. Al Coda is the third and final album by the progressive rock and jazz fusion group National Health. It is a tribute to former member Alan Gowen, who died of leukaemia in May 1981, and consists solely of compositions written by him. Most of these had not been recorded in the studio before, although "TNTFX" and "Arriving Twice" both appeared earlier on albums by Gowen's other band Gilgamesh.

Track listing

Personnel
National Health
Dave Stewart - Synthesizer, organ, electric piano
Phil Miller - Electric guitar, acoustic guitar
John Greaves - Bass guitar
Pip Pyle - Drums, electronic drums

Additional musicians
Elton Dean - Saxello (1, 4)
Ted Emmett - Trumpet (1)
Barbara Gaskin - Vocals (7)
Jimmy Hastings - Flute (3, 6, 9)
Amanda Parsons - Vocals (7)
Richard Sinclair - Vocals (3)
Annie Whitehead - Trombone (1)

References
http://www.allmusic.com/album/ds-al-coda-mw0000840466

National Health albums
1982 albums